Mónica Baltodano was a commander of the guerrilla revolutionary group known as the Sandinista National Liberation Front during the Nicaraguan Revolution. She worked in the movement for several decades, and after experiencing the corruption and authoritarianism within the movement, she left in 2005 to form the Movement to Rescue Sandinismo (Movimiento por el Rescate del Sandinismo), known as El Rescate.

Biography 
Baltodano was born in Leon, Nicaragua on August 14, 1954. She is one of nine children, two boys and seven girls. Her father was a lawyer and her mother was a shop owner. She attended Catholic school in La Pureza with her six sisters while her two brothers studied in La Salle. Her family moved to Managua in 1972 when her mother split from her father due to what she saw as a lack of acceptance of her involvement in the war. All of Baltodano's siblings were revolutionaries as well, with her sister Alma losing her hands while building a contact bomb at age 15 and her sister Zulemita losing her life in a bombing at age 16. Baltodano has four children of her own, including environmental lawyer and activist Mónica López Baltodano.

Political involvement 
Baltodano became politically involved in high school when she worked on the campaign to free Doris Tijerino, a Sandinista revolutionary, from prison. She joined the Revolutionary Students Front, an armed group of young revolutionaries in 1972. Baltodano went underground with the Sandinista movement in 1974, compelled to action by the nation's declining political and economic conditions. In 1977 she was captured, arrested, and tortured for nine months while leading the North Front of the FSLN. After her release, she was put in charge of the capital, leading the movement's activities in Managua. By then a Guerrilla Commander, she led the final offensive of the revolution in 1979.

When the war ended, Baltodano took a more political role and was appointed Secretariat of Mass Organizations. After several decades in the FSLN, Baltodano took issue with what she described as an authoritarian, vertical leadership style rife with corruption. Because of this, she left the party in 2005 to form the Movement to Rescue Sandinismo, known in Nicaragua as El Rescate.

Baltodano was one of several FSLN women featured in the 2018 documentary ¡Las Sandinistas!.

In March 2022 she was amongst 151 international feminists signing Feminist Resistance Against War: A Manifesto, in solidarity with the Feminist Anti-War Resistance initiated by Russian feminists after the Russian invasion of Ukraine.

References

Further reading 
Global Feminisms Project at the University of Michigan

1954 births
Living people
21st-century Nicaraguan women politicians
21st-century Nicaraguan politicians
Sandinista National Liberation Front politicians
People from León, Nicaragua
People of the Nicaraguan Revolution
Nicaraguan women's rights activists
Nicaraguan women activists